Parag Chaliha (1923-1999) was an Indian politician. He was a Member of Parliament, representing Assam in the Rajya Sabha the upper house of India's Parliament representing the Asom Gana Parishad.

References

Lok Sabha members from Assam
Rajya Sabha members from Assam
1923 births
1999 deaths
Asom Gana Parishad politicians